Arous may refer to:

 Arous, one of the Seven Heavens according to Shi'ite sources

People
 Abdessalem Arous (born 1979), Tunisian judoka
 Gérard Ben Arous (born 1957), French mathematician
 Islam Arous (born 1996), Algerian footballer
 Eddy Ben Arous (born 1990), French rugby union player of Nigerian origin

Places
 Arous Village, a once-abandoned holiday resort on the Sudanese Red Sea coast featured in the film The Red Sea Diving Resort
 Ain al-Arous, a Syrian village
 Ben Arous, a city in Tunisia

See also
 The Brain from Planet Arous, a 1957 American science fiction film